Tropocyclops federensis is a species of crustacean in the family Cyclopidae. It is endemic to Brazil.  Its natural habitat is freshwater lakes.

References

Cyclopidae
Fauna of Brazil
Freshwater crustaceans of South America
Endemic fauna of Brazil
Taxonomy articles created by Polbot
Crustaceans described in 1991